Maria Hendrika Leonarda "Myriam" van Rooyen-Steenman ( Steenman, born 17 April 1950) is a retired Dutch rower. She competed at the pre1972 Summer Olympics and the 1976 Summer Olympics in the coxed fours and finished in respectively first and in fifth place. She won a European title in this event in 1973, won a silver medal at the 1974 World Championships and finished fifth at the 1975 World Championships.

Until 1975 she competed under her maiden name Steenman, and since 1976 as van Rooijen-Steenman.

References

1950 births
Living people
Dutch female rowers
Olympic rowers of the Netherlands
Rowers at the 1976 Summer Olympics
Rowers from Amsterdam
European Rowing Championships medalists
World Rowing Championships medalists for the Netherlands
20th-century Dutch women
20th-century Dutch people
21st-century Dutch women